An intrauterine device (IUD), also known as intrauterine contraceptive device (IUCD or ICD) or coil, is a small, often T-shaped birth control device that is inserted into the uterus to prevent pregnancy. IUDs are one form of long-acting reversible birth control (LARC).  One study found that female family planning providers choose LARC methods more often (41.7%) than the general public (12.1%). Among birth control methods, IUDs, along with other contraceptive implants, result in the greatest satisfaction among users.

IUDs are safe and effective in adolescents as well as those who have not previously had children. Once an IUD is removed, even after long-term use, fertility returns to normal rapidly. Copper devices have a failure rate of about 0.8% while hormonal (levonorgestrel) devices fail about 0.2% of the time within the first year of use. In comparison, male sterilization and male condoms have a failure rate of about 0.15% and 15%, respectively. Copper IUDs can also be used as emergency contraception within five days of unprotected sex.

Although copper IUDs may increase menstrual bleeding and result in painful cramps, hormonal IUDs may reduce menstrual bleeding or stop menstruation altogether. However, women can have daily spotting for several months and it can take up to three months for there to be a 90% decrease in bleeding with hormonal IUDs. Cramping can be treated with NSAIDs. More serious potential complications include expulsion (2–5%) and rarely perforation of the uterus (less than 0.7%). IUDs do not affect breastfeeding and can be inserted immediately after delivery. They may also be used immediately after an abortion.

The use of IUDs increased within the United States from 0.8% in 1995 to 7.2% from the period of 2006 to 2014. The use of IUDs as a form of birth control dates from the 1800s. A previous model known as the Dalkon shield was associated with an increased risk of pelvic inflammatory disease (PID). However, current models do not affect PID risk in women without sexually transmitted infections during the time of insertion.

Mechanism

IUDs primarily work by preventing fertilization. The progestogen released from hormonal IUDs mainly works by thickening the cervical mucus, preventing sperm from reaching the fallopian tubes. IUDs may also function by preventing ovulation from occurring but this only occurs partially.

Copper IUDs do not contain any hormones, but release copper ions, which are toxic to sperm. They also cause the uterus and fallopian tubes to produce a fluid that contains white blood cells, copper ions, enzymes, and prostaglandins, which is also toxic to sperm. The very high effectiveness of copper-containing IUDs as emergency contraceptives implies they may also act by preventing implantation of the blastocyst.

Types
The types of intrauterine devices available, and the names they go by, differ by location. In the United States, there are two types available:

 Nonhormonal: Copper-containing IUD (ParaGard and others)
 Hormonal: Progestogen-releasing IUD (Mirena and others)

The WHO ATC labels both copper and hormonal devices as IUDs. In the United Kingdom, there are more than 10 different types of copper IUDs available. In the United Kingdom, the term IUD refers only to these copper devices. Hormonal intrauterine contraception is labeled with the term intrauterine system (IUS).

Non-hormonal

Copper 

Most copper IUDs have a  T-shaped frame that is wound around with pure electrolytic copper wire and/or has copper collars (sleeves). The arms of the frame hold the IUD in place near the top of the uterus. The Paragard TCu 380a measures 32 mm (1.26") horizontally (top of the T), and 36 mm (1.42") vertically (leg of the T). Copper IUDs have a first year failure rate ranging from 0.1 to 2.2%. They work by damaging sperm and disrupting their motility so that they are not able to join an egg. Specifically, copper acts as a spermicide within the uterus by increasing levels of copper ions, prostaglandins, and white blood cells within the uterine and tubal fluids. The increased copper ions in the cervical mucus inhibit the sperm's motility and viability, preventing sperm from traveling through the cervical mucus, or destroying it as it passes through. Copper can also alter the endometrial lining, and while studies show that while this alteration can prevent implantation of a fertilized egg ("blastocyst"), it cannot disrupt one that has already been implanted.

Advantages of the copper IUD include its ability to provide emergency contraception up to five days after unprotected sex. It is the most effective form of emergency contraception available. It works by preventing fertilization or implantation but does not affect already implanted embryos. It contains no hormones, so it can be used while breastfeeding, and fertility returns quickly after removal.
Copper IUDs also last longer and are available in a wider range of sizes and shapes compared to hormonal IUDs. Disadvantages include the possibility of heavier menstrual periods and more painful cramps.

IUDs that contain gold or silver also exist. Other shapes of IUD include the so-called U-shaped IUDs, such as the Load and Multiload, and the frameless IUD that holds several hollow cylindrical minuscule copper beads. It is held in place by a suture (knot) to the fundus of the uterus. It is mainly available in China and Europe. A framed copper IUD called the IUB SCu300 coils when deployed and forms a three-dimensional spherical shape. It is based on a nickel titanium shape memory alloy core. In addition to copper, noble metal, and progestogen IUDs, women in China can get copper IUDs with indomethacin. This non-hormonal compound reduces the severity of menstrual bleeding, and these coils are popular.

Inert
Inert IUDs do not have a bioactive component. They are made of inert materials like stainless steel (such as the stainless steel ring (SSR), a flexible ring of steel coils that can deform to be inserted through the cervix) or plastic (such as the Lippes Loop, which can be inserted through the cervix in a cannula and takes a trapezoidal shape within the uterus). They are less effective than copper or hormonal IUDs, with a side effect profile similar to copper IUDs. Their primary mechanism of action is inducing a local foreign body reaction, which makes the uterine environment hostile both to sperm and to implantation of an embryo. They may have higher rates of preventing pregnancy after fertilization, instead of before fertilization, compared to copper or hormonal IUDs.

Inert IUDs are not yet approved for use in the United States, UK, or Canada. In China, where IUDs are the most common form of contraception, copper IUD production replaced inert IUD production in 1993. However, as of 2008, the most common IUD used by immigrants presenting to Canadian clinics for removal of IUDs placed in China was still the SSR. Because the SSR has no string for removal, it can present a challenge to healthcare providers unfamiliar with IUD types not available in their region.

Hormonal

Hormonal IUDs (referred to as intrauterine systems in the UK) work by releasing a small amount of levonorgestrel, a progestin. Each type varies in size, amount of levonorgestrel released, and duration. The primary mechanism of action is making the inside of the uterus uninhabitable for sperm. They can also thin the endometrial lining and potentially impair implantation but this is not their usual function. Because they thin the endometrial lining, they can also reduce or even prevent menstrual bleeding. As a result, they are used to treat menorrhagia (heavy menses), once pathologic causes of menorrhagia (such as uterine polyps) have been ruled out.

The progestin released by hormonal IUDs primarily acts locally; use of Mirena results in much lower systemic progestin levels than other very-low-dose progestogen only contraceptives.

Adverse effects

Regardless of IUD type, there are some potential side effects that are similar for all IUDs. Some of these side effects include bleeding pattern changes, expulsion, pelvic inflammatory disease (especially in the first 21 days after insertion), and rarely uterine perforation. A small probability of pregnancy remains after IUD insertion, and when it occurs, there is a greater risk of ectopic pregnancy.

IUDs with progestogen confer an increased risk of ovarian cysts, and IUDs with copper confer an increased risk of heavier periods.

Menstrual cup companies recommend that women with IUDs who are considering using menstrual cups should consult with their gynecologists before use. There have been rare cases in which women using IUDs dislodged them when removing their menstrual cups, however, this can also happen with tampon use.

Unlike condoms, the IUD does not protect against sexually transmitted infections.

IUDs do not lead to infertility or make it harder for a woman to become pregnant, and fertility typically returns within days of removal. Some prior studies found an association between infertility and the Dalkon Shield, an early form of an IUD which is no longer available for use.

Modern IUDs do not cause increased infection, though the earlier Dalkon Shield may have, because it contained multifilament strings, which provided bacteria a space to grow and move up the string. IUDs manufactured after 2008 use monofilament strings in order to prevent this from happening. However, as with any medical intervention, IUDs can lead to increased risk of infection immediately after the insertion.

According to the U.S. Medical Eligibility Criteria for Contraceptive Use, published by the CDC, women and adolescents under the age of 20 and women who have not given birth are classified in category 2 for IUD use, mainly due to "the risk for expulsion from nulliparity and for STDs from sexual behavior in younger age groups." According to the CDC, benefits generally outweigh the risks, and IUDs are recommended for young and nulliparous women, although more careful attention may be required. Women over age 20 and those who have previously given birth are placed in category 1, meaning no special concerns are placed on use.

Some women experience amenorrhea, or lack of menstruation while using an IUD. Menstruation occurs when a woman has not become pregnant and the uterus sheds its lining in preparation for the next cycle. IUDs tend to thin the lining of the uterus, leading to less menses by volume or a lack of menstruation altogether. There is a condition known as polycystic ovarian syndrome (PCOS) which causes women to miss their periods and can lead to an increased risk of endometrial cancer. However, an IUD causes the endometrial lining of a uterus to thin, which is the opposite of what occurs with PCOS.  

The main mechanisms of action of IUDs occur prior to fertilization, by preventing sperm from ever reaching the egg. The copper-bearing IUD acts as a spermicide, killing or impairing sperm so they cannot reach the egg. IUDs that contain progestin cause the cervical mucus to thicken, which stops sperm from entering the uterus.

Insertion and removal 

It is difficult to predict what a woman will experience during IUD insertion or removal. Some women describe the insertion as cramps, some as a pinch, and others do not feel anything. Only 9% of nulliparous women considered the procedure painless, 72% moderately painful, and substantial pain with insertion that needs active management occurs in approximately 17% of nulliparous women and approximately 11% of parous women. In such cases, NSAIDs are effective. Topical lidocaine has been found as an effective pain management drug when applied before the procedure. The use of intrauterine lidocaine (paracervical block) is underutilized in the United States as an effective method to reduce pain associated with insertion.

IUD insertion can occur at multiple timepoints in a woman's reproductive lifespan:
 interval insertion, the most common, occurs remote from pregnancy;
 post-abortion or post-miscarriage insertion occurs following an abortion or miscarriage when the uterus is known to be empty;
 postpartum insertion occurs after a woman gives birth either immediately, while the woman is still in the hospital, or delayed, up to 6-weeks following delivery, following either vaginal delivery or cesarean delivery. Insertion timing changes the risk of IUD expulsion.

Procedure
During the insertion procedure, health care providers use a speculum to find the cervix (the opening to the uterus), pinch the cervix to stabilize it open with a tenaculum, and then use an insertion device to place the IUD in the uterus. The insertion device goes through the cervix. The procedure itself, if uncomplicated, should take no more than five to ten minutes.

For immediate postpartum insertion, the IUD is inserted following the removal of the placenta from the uterus. The uterus is larger than baseline following birth, which has important implications for insertion. After vaginal deliveries, insertions can be done using placental forceps, a longer inserter specialized for postpartum insertions, or manually, where the provider uses their hand to insert the IUD in the uterus. After cesarean deliveries, the IUD is placed in the uterus with forceps or manually during surgery prior to suturing the uterine incision.

Generally, the removal is uncomplicated and reported to be not as painful as the insertion because there is no instrument that needs to go through the cervix. This process requires the health care provider to find the cervix with a speculum and then use ring forceps, which only go into the vagina, to grasp the IUD strings and then pull the IUD out.

IUD placement and removal can be taught both by manufacturers and other training facilities.

History 
The history of intrauterine devices dates back to the early 1900s. Unlike modern intrauterine devices, early interuterine devices crossed both the vagina and the uterus, causing a high rate of pelvic inflammatory disease. The first IUD was developed in 1909 by the German physician Richard Richter, of Waldenburg. His device was made of silkworm gut and was not widely used.

Ernst Gräfenberg, another German physician (after whom the G-spot is named), created the first Ring IUD, Gräfenberg's ring, made of silver filaments. His work was suppressed during the Nazi regime, when contraception was considered a threat to Aryan women. He moved to the United States, where his colleagues H. Hall and M. Stone took up his work after his death and created the stainless steel Hall-Stone Ring. A Japanese doctor named Tenrei Ota also developed a silver or gold IUD called the Precea or Pressure Ring.

Jack Lippes helped begin the increase of IUD use in the United States in the late 1950s. In this time, thermoplastics, which can bend for insertion and retain their original shape, became the material used for first-generation IUDs. Lippes also devised the addition of the monofilament nylon string, which facilitates IUD removal. His trapezoid shape Lippes Loop IUD became one of the most popular first-generation IUDs. In the following years, many different shaped plastic IUDs were invented and marketed. These included the infamous Dalkon Shield, whose poor design caused bacterial infection and led to thousands of lawsuits. Although the Dalkon shield was removed from the market, it had a lasting, negative impact on IUD use and reputation in the United States. Lazar C. Margulies developed the first plastic IUD using thermoplastics in the 1960s. His innovation allowed insertion of the IUD into the uterus without the need to dilate the cervix.

The invention of the copper IUD in the 1960s brought with it the capital 'T' shaped design used by most modern IUDs. U.S. physician Howard Tatum determined that the 'T' shape would work better with the shape of the uterus, which forms a 'T' when contracted. He predicted this would reduce rates of IUD expulsion. Together, Tatum and Chilean physician Jaime Zipper discovered that copper could be an effective spermicide and developed the first copper IUD, TCu200. Improvements by Tatum led to the creation of the TCu380A (ParaGard), which is currently the preferred copper IUD.

The hormonal IUD was also invented in the 1960s and 1970s; initially the goal was to mitigate the increased menstrual bleeding associated with copper and inert IUDs. The first model, Progestasert, was conceived of by Antonio Scommegna and created by Tapani J. V. Luukkainen, but the device only lasted for one year of use. Progestasert was manufactured until 2001. One commercial hormonal IUD which is currently available, Mirena, was also developed by Luukkainen and released in 1976. The manufacturer of the Mirena, Bayer AG, became the target of multiple lawsuits over allegations that Bayer failed to adequately warn users that the IUD could pierce the uterus and migrate to other parts of the body.

China
In China, the use of IUDs by state health services was part of the government's efforts to limit birth rates. From 1980 to 2014, 324 million women were inserted with IUDs, in addition to the 107 million who had tubal ligation. Women who refused could lose their government employment and their children could lose access to public schools. The IUDs inserted in this way were modified such that they could not be removed in a doctor's office (meant to be left indefinitely), and surgical removal is usually needed. Until the mid-1990s, the state-preferred IUD was a stainless steel ring, which had a higher rate of complications compared to other types of IUD. It gave rise to the idiom  meaning "insert a loop". Nowadays, the IUDs include T and V shapes, the former being the most common and easiest to remove.

To implement the two-child policy, the government announced that IUD-removals would be paid for by the government. IUD removals are free for women "who are allowed to have another child" (see one-child policy) or "who cannot continue to have the IUD for health reasons."

Cost
In the United States, the price of an IUD may range from $0 to $1,300.  The price includes medical exams, insertion, and follow-up visits.
Under the Affordable Care Act, most insurance plans are required to cover all forms of birth control, including IUDs, although they may not cover all IUD brands.

References

 
Dosage forms
Drug delivery devices